Gagar is a rural locality (a selo) in Kolobsky Selsoviet, Tlyaratinsky District, Republic of Dagestan, Russia. The population was 660 as of 2010.

Geography 
Gagar is located 35 km southeast of Tlyarata (the district's administrative centre) by road. Tsimguda is the nearest rural locality.

References 

Rural localities in Tlyaratinsky District